Kirpichny (masculine), Kirpichnaya (feminine), or Kirpichnoye (neuter) is the name of several rural localities in Russia. The toponym derives from the Russian word "", meaning "brick".

Modern localities
Kirpichny, Altai Krai, a settlement in Verkh-Obsky Selsoviet of Smolensky District in Altai Krai; 
Kirpichny, Bryansk Oblast, a khutor in Gorodishchensky Rural Administrative Okrug of Pogarsky District in Bryansk Oblast; 
Kirpichny, Khanty-Mansi Autonomous Okrug, a settlement in Khanty-Mansiysky District of Khanty-Mansi Autonomous Okrug
Kirpichny, Kostroma Oblast, a settlement in Yemsnenskoye Settlement of Nerekhtsky District in Kostroma Oblast; 
Kirpichny, Slavyansky District, Krasnodar Krai, a settlement in Prikubansky Rural Okrug of Slavyansky District in Krasnodar Krai; 
Kirpichny, Tikhoretsky District, Krasnodar Krai, a settlement in Alexeyevsky Rural Okrug of Tikhoretsky District in Krasnodar Krai; 
Kirpichny, Timashyovsky District, Krasnodar Krai, a settlement under the administrative jurisdiction of the Town of Timashyovsk in Timashyovsky District of Krasnodar Krai; 
Kirpichny, Kursk Oblast, a khutor in Banishchansky Selsoviet of Lgovsky District in Kursk Oblast
Kirpichny, Mari El Republic, a settlement under the administrative jurisdiction of Krasnogorsky Urban-Type Settlement in Zvenigovsky District of the Mari El Republic
Kirpichny, Oryol Oblast, a settlement in Dolbenkinsky Selsoviet of Dmitrovsky District in Oryol Oblast
Kirpichny, Rostov Oblast, a khutor in Verkhnesolenovskoye Rural Settlement of Vesyolovsky District in Rostov Oblast
Kirpichny, Sverdlovsk Oblast, a settlement under the administrative jurisdiction of the Town of Verkhnyaya Pyshma in Sverdlovsk Oblast
Kirpichny, Volgograd Oblast, a khutor in Prigorodny Selsoviet of Frolovsky District in Volgograd Oblast
Kirpichnoye, Krasnodar Krai, a selo in Georgiyevsky Rural Okrug of Tuapsinsky District in Krasnodar Krai; 
Kirpichnoye, Leningrad Oblast, a settlement in Krasnoselskoye Settlement Municipal Formation of Vyborgsky District in Leningrad Oblast; 
Kirpichnoye, Primorsky Krai, a village in Mikhaylovsky District of Primorsky Krai
Kirpichnoye, Republic of Tatarstan, a selo in Nurlatsky District of the Republic of Tatarstan
Kirpichnoye, Tomsk Oblast, a village in Chainsky District of Tomsk Oblast
Kirpichnoye, Vologda Oblast, a settlement in Kamensky Selsoviet of Gryazovetsky District in Vologda Oblast

Abolished localities
Kirpichny, Khabarovsk Krai, a settlement in Okhotsky District of Khabarovsk Krai; abolished in October 2013

Alternative names
Kirpichnaya, alternative name of Kirpichnoye, a village in Mikhaylovsky District of Primorsky Krai